Franklin bells (also known as Gordon's Bells or lightning bells) are an early demonstration of electric charge designed to work with a Leyden jar. Franklin bells are only a qualitative indicator of electric charge and were used for simple demonstrations rather than research. This was the first device that converted electrical energy into mechanical energy in the form of continuous mechanical motion, in this case, the moving of a bell clapper back and forth between two oppositely charged bells.

History 
Scientific investigation on of the phenomena of lightning originates with Benjamin Franklin. He accumulated analogical evidence favoring the supposition that lightning must be an electrical discharge on a large scale. This device is named for Benjamin Franklin, an early adopter who used it during his experimentation with electricity. It was invented by the Scottish inventor Andrew Gordon, Professor of Natural Philosophy at the University of Erfurt, Germany. About 1742 he invented a device known as the "electric chimes", which was widely described in textbooks of electricity. Franklin made use of Gordon's idea by connecting one bell to his pointed lightning rod, attached to a chimney, and a second bell to the ground. One of his papers contains the following description:

In September 1752, I erected an iron rod to draw the lightning down into my house, in order to make some experiments on it, with two bells to give notice when the rod should be electrified.

I found the bells rang sometimes when there was no lightning or thunder, but only a dark cloud over the rod; that sometimes after a flash of lightning they would suddenly stop; and at other times, when they had not rang before, they would, after a flash, suddenly begin to ring; that the electricity was sometimes very faint, so that when a small spark was obtained, another could not be got for sometime after; at other times the sparks would follow extremely quick, and once I had a continual stream from bell to bell, the size of a crow-quill. Even during the same gust there were considerable variations.Franklin's experimentation with the bell setup was pivotal to discovering that electricity exists outside of lightning and thunderstorms. The bells' odd properties intrigued Franklin and fueled further hypotheses.

Design and operation 
The bells consist of a metal stand with a crossbar, from which hang three bells. The outer two bells hang from conductive metal chains, while the central bell hangs from a nonconductive thread. In the spaces between these bells hang two metal clappers, small pendulums, on nonconductive threads. A short metal chain hangs from the central bell.

The central bell's chain is put in contact with the inner surface of a Leyden jar, while the outside surface of the jar is put in contact with the metal stand. Thus, the central bell takes its charge from the inner surface of the jar, while the outer surface charges the two bells on the conductive chains. This causes the bells to have a difference in electrical potential equal to that between the inner and outer surfaces of the jar. The hanging metal clappers will be attracted to one bell, will touch it, pick up its charge, and be repelled; they will then swing across to the other bell, and do the same there. Each time the clappers touch a bell, charge is transferred between the inner and outer surfaces of the Leyden jar. When the jar is completely discharged, the bells will stop ringing.

See also 
 Oxford Electric Bell, a set of electrostatic bells in the University of Oxford, has been ringing continuously since 1840.
 Lightning-prediction system

References

External links 
 Ben Franklin's Lightning Bells(Franklin Institute)
 Franklin’s Bells (Gordon’s Bells) (PV Scientific Instruments)
 "Franklin’s Bells" and charge transport as an undergraduate lab (American Journal of Physics)
 Franklin's Bells (Research Media & Cybernetics)

Benjamin Franklin
Electricity
Capacitors
Energy storage
Historical scientific instruments
Science demonstrations
Lightning